Bystre may refer to the following places in Poland:
Bystre, Lower Silesian Voivodeship (south-west Poland)
Bystre, Podlaskie Voivodeship (north-east Poland)
Bystre, Lesko County in Subcarpathian Voivodeship (south-east Poland)
Bystre, Nisko County in Subcarpathian Voivodeship (south-east Poland)
Bystre, Bieszczady County in Subcarpathian Voivodeship (south-east Poland)

See also 
 Bystré (disambiguation)